The 2020–21 Major Clubs Limited Over Tournament was a List A cricket competition that took place in Sri Lanka. It ran from 24 March to 11 April 2021, with twenty-six teams taking part. Chilaw Marians Cricket Club were the defending champions, winning the 2019–20 Invitation Limited Over Tournament.

On 28 March 2021, in the Group A match between Sri Lanka Army Sports Club and Bloomfield Cricket and Athletic Club, Army Sports Club's captain Thisara Perera hit six sixes in one over off the bowling of Dilhan Cooray. Perera became the first Sri Lankan to achieve this in a domestic cricket match, and he also scored the second-fastest fifty in List A cricket.

Nondescripts Cricket Club and Ragama Cricket Club won their respective semi-final matches to advance to the final, with Nondescripts winning the match by 145 runs.

Group stage

Group A

Group B

Group C

Group D

Knockout stage

Quarterfinals

Finals

References

External links
 Series home at ESPN Cricinfo

Major Clubs Limited Over Tournament
Major Clubs Limited Over Tournament